The men's welterweight (67 kg/147.4 lbs) Low-Kick division at the W.A.K.O. European Championships 2004 in Budva was the sixth lightest of the male Low-Kick tournaments and involved ten fighters.  Each of the matches was three rounds of two minutes each and were fought under Low-Kick kickboxing rules.

The tournament gold medal went to Russia's Ibragim Tamazaev who defeated France's Vahid Roshani by unanimous decision.  Roshani (who would later represent Iran) would have his silver medal stripped by W.A.K.O. due to an undisclosed issue.  Defeated semi finalists Frand Seyed Morteza from Iran and Eldin Raonic from Bosnia and Herzegovina picked up bronze medals for their efforts.

Results
These matches ended in a split decision.

See also
List of WAKO Amateur European Championships
List of WAKO Amateur World Championships
List of male kickboxers

References

External links
 WAKO World Association of Kickboxing Organizations Official Site

W.A.K.O. European Championships 2004 (Budva)